Morteza Mohases is an Iranian football coach and instructor. He also works as a FIFA coaching instructor.

Mohases has previously worked as assistant coach of German coach Roland Koch at Esteghlal F.C. during the club's unsuccessful 2002-03 season.

Mohases was part of FIFA's technical study group for the 2007 FIFA U-20 World Cup.

References

Living people
Iranian football managers
1952 births